The following is a list of people from St Helens, Merseyside in northern England, United Kingdom.

Notable families

Beechams

The Beecham dynasty is one of the most notable families to be associated with St. Helens. Thomas Beecham opened his first factory, in St. Helens, 16 years after launching, and producing, his products from a small premises in nearby Wigan.

His son Joseph Beecham built up the business and promoted classical music in the town. Conductor Sir Thomas Beecham, son of Joseph, was born in St Helens.

Pilkingtons

The Pilkington dynasty is another notable family associated with St. Helens having founded the largest glass manufacturer in the United Kingdom as well as inventing the float glass process which was subsequently licensed for use by other glass manufacturers.

Authors
 Carole Matthews, Author of 33 bestselling books.
 Una McCormack, Best-selling science fiction author and lecturer in creative writing.

Entertainment
 Bernie Clifton, comedian and entertainer
 Tim Follin, video game music composer 
 George Groves is credited with being Hollywood's first "sound man", as he was the recording engineer on the seminal Al Jolson picture, The Jazz Singer (1927), as well as many other early talkies
 Michael Parr, actor
 Emma Rigby, actress
 Johnny Vegas, actor, comedian and presenter
 David Yates, feature film director who is credited with the final four Harry Potter films, was raised in Rainhill (a village in the Borough of St Helens)
 Pauline Yates: Actress.
Elton Welsby, Television Presenter, noted for his coverage of crown green bowls

Singers and musicians
 Jacqueline Abbott, singer with The Beautiful South
 Rick Astley, vocalist from Newton-le-Willows
 Peter Edward Clarke, (better known by his stage name "Budgie", a well known  drummer with, among others, The Slits, Siouxsie and The Banshees and The Creatures);
 The Lancashire Hotpots, comedy folk band
 Jeffrey Walker, bassist and lead vocalist of Carcass

Politics
 Richard Seddon, Prime Minister of New Zealand, from Eccleston, a village in the Borough of St. Helens and the country's longest-serving Prime Minister to date, holding the office from 1893 until 1906.
 Richard Pilkington, Member of Parliament for Newton from 1899 until 1906
 Richard Pilkington, Member of Parliament for Widnes (1935 to 1945) and Poole (1951 to 1964)
 Thérèse Coffey: Member of Parliament, from Billinge, a village in the Borough of St Helens.
 James Sexton, Member of Parliament for St Helens from 1918 to 1931

Other
 Ann Barnes former police commissioner for Kent
 David Bernstein former chairman of The Football Association
 John William Draper scientist
 Carol Kefford, senior British nurse
 Peter Moore serial killer
 John Rylands, Victorian philanthropist
 James Waterworth, English Catholic missionary priest
 Criminal John Venables spent some time in jail at the Red Bank secure unit
 Sir Edmund Vestey, 1st Baronet: Food moguls.
 William Vestey, 1st Baron Vestey: Shipping Magnate.

Sport

Rugby league
St Helens is particularly known for producing many professional rugby league players, many have played for St. Helens.
 Lee Briers, has represented Great Britain and Wales
 Keiron Cunningham, has represented Great Britain and Wales
 Eric Fraser, has represented Great Britain
 Steve Ganson, referee
 Kurt Haggerty, has represented Ireland 
 Alan Hardman, has represented England
 Dave Hull 
 Les Jones
 Tim Jonkers 
 Frank Lee
 Scott Moore
 Alex Murphy
 James Roby
 Mike Roby
 Adam Swift
 Luke Thompson
 Paul Wellens

Football
 Alan A'Court: Footballer, England international. 
 Jack Bamber: Footballer, England international. 
 Conor Coady : Footballer, England international.
 John Connelly: , England 1966 World Cup winner.
 Bill Foulkes, full-back for Manchester United between 1952 and 1970 and was a survivor of the Munich air disaster in 1958.
 Chris Foy, referee
 Kellie-Ann Leyland
 Tommy Lucas, Footballer, England international.
 Bill Luckett: Footballer.
 David Mercer: Footballer, England international.
 Lily Parr: Footballer.
 Hubert Redwood: Footballer.

Motor sport
 Geoff Duke, multiple Isle of Man TT winner and motorcycle Grand Prix road racing world champion
 Colin Hardman, sidecar racer. Winner of the 1989 Isle of Man TT Sidecar Race 'A'
 Andy Middlehurst
 Richie Worrall, professional speedway rider
 Steve Worrall, professional speedway rider

Darts
 Stephen Bunting, professional darts player
 Dave Chisnall, professional darts player
 Michael Smith, professional darts player, 2022 Grand Slam of Darts and 2023 PDC World Championship winner.
 Alan Tabern, professional darts player

Cricket
 Keith Harris, List A cricketer
 David Russell, first-class and List A cricketer
 Ken Shuttleworth, cricketer who has represented England

Other
 Ian Gregson, Canadian paralympian
 Dan Highcock, wheelchair basketball player
 Tommy Horton, Golfer
 Martin Murray, boxer
 Gary Stretch, boxer, actor

References

External links

St Helens, Merseyside
 
Saint Helens